Teretia fusianceps is an extinct species of sea snail, a marine gastropod mollusk in the family Raphitomidae.

Description

Distribution
Fossils of this marine species were found in Miocene strata in the Netherlands

References

 Nordsieck, F. (1972) Die Miozäne Molluskenfauna von Miste-Winterswijk NL (Hemmoor).Fischer Verlag, Stuttgart, 187 pp.

External links
 Morassi M. & Bonfitto A. (2015). New Indo-Pacific species of the genus Teretia Norman, 1888 (Gastropoda: Raphitomidae). Zootaxa. 3911(4): 560-570 
 

fusianceps
Gastropods described in 1972